The Church of the Life-Giving Trinity ( or Свято-Троицкая церковь) is a Russian Orthodox church in Kamensk-Shakhtinsky, Rostov Oblast, Russia. It belongs to Kamenskoe deanery of Shakhty and Millerovo diocese.

History
The Holy Trinity parish was established in Kamensk-Shakhtinsky in April 1997. In 1998, the parish was granted a building in which a prayer house was arranged. The church itself was opened on July 9, 1998, and has only one altar consecrated in honour of the Holy Trinity. Subsequently, a dome was also built there, and in 2003 a belfry was installed with new bells. Now there are five domes, a refectory and a low bell tower. Building's architecture resembles that of the late 19th century.

The Holy Trinity possesses a fragment of the holy relics of St. Tikhon of Zadonsk, who was a Bishop of Voronezh and a wonderworker.

In the church there are also a canteen for homeless, a Sunday school, church charity shop and a choir.

References

Churches in Rostov Oblast
1997 establishments in Russia
Churches completed in 2003
Church buildings with domes
Russian Orthodox church buildings in Russia